Jasmine Sokko (born 8 November 1995) is a Singaporean singer-songwriter. Known for wearing her trademark masks to conceal part of her face, she is also one of the top most-streamed Singaporean female singers on Spotify.

Education
Sokko graduated from the Singapore Management University in 2016 with a Bachelor of Business Management degree. She was also awarded the SMU Emerging Artist Award.

Career 
In 2016, Sokko made her single debut "1057" which she also wrote and produced. She signed with 13 Orphans Records. The song was on the top of Spotify's Singapore viral charts when it was released. In 2017, she released her debut EP titled "N°" (Number), containing the singles, titled after numbers, she had released thus far.

In 2018, she released single "Hurt", her first major-label debut on Warner Music Singapore. She also took part in the Chinese electronic music talent reality competition show Rave Now which premiered on 1 December 2018. She was the only Singaporean and finished fourth in the competition. 

On 3 November 2019, Sokko became the first Singaporean artiste to win the award for Best Southeast Asian Act at the MTV Europe Music Awards. Driven by her participation in Rave Now, Sokko released a Chinese EP, Made in Future in November 2020.

Discography

Singles
 "1057" (2016)
 "H2O" (2017)
 "600D" (2017)
 "Porcupine" (2017)
 "#0000FF" (2017)
 "#F5" (2018)
 "Hurt" (2018)
 "Tired" (2019)
 "Shh" (2019)
 "Fever" (2020)
 "Mess" (2020)
 "I Like It" (2020)
 "we could be so electric" (2022)
 "modern day titanic" (2022)
 "future tense” (2022)

Extended plays
 Nº (2017)
 新乐园 / Made In Future (2020)
 θi = θr (2021)

References

External links

1995 births
Living people
21st-century Singaporean women singers
Singaporean composers
Singaporean singer-songwriters
MTV Europe Music Award winners
Saint Andrew's Junior College alumni
Singapore Management University alumni
 Singaporean people of Chinese descent